Kovalik is a Slavic language occupational surname derived from the occupation of smith (koval).

The surname may refer to:
Jozef Kovalík, Slovak tennis player
Dan Kovalik, American human rights, labor rights lawyer and peace activist

Slavic-language surnames
Occupational surnames